The Dauletabad Gas Field (also Döwletabat, Dauletabad-Donmez, and until 1991 known as Sovietabad) is a large natural gas field located in Mary, Mary province, Turkmenistan. It is located in the vicinity of the Turkmenistan–Iran border, and is named after the Dowlatabad settlement across the border in Iran.  The field is a part of the Amu-Darya oil-gas province.

History
The Dauletabad structural feature was detected during geological surveys in 1957–1960. The Dauletabad arch was confirmed by seismic surveys in 1968. The exploratory wells confirming existence of natural gas reserves were drilled in 1972–1974.  Production started at the Dauletabad field in 1982.

After the independence of Turkmenistan, production declined significantly, but increased again after 1998. The gas is exported via the Central Asia-Center gas pipeline system. Starting from December 2009, gas is supplied also to Iran through the Dauletabad–Salyp Yar pipeline.

Reserves
In 2005, the Asian Development Bank estimated gross reserves .

It was considered to be the largest gas field in Turkmenistan until thorough evaluation of reserves at a newly discovered Yolotan field were made public.

The Dauletabad field has been cited as a possible supply source for the Trans-Afghanistan Pipeline, but according to the Asian Development Bank, the field's production forecasts are "lower than expected" and "production is predicted to decline."

See also

Dauletabad–Salyp Yar pipeline
Turkmenistan-China gas pipeline
Bagtyýarlyk contractual territory
Ýolöten Gas Field
Saman-Depe Gas Field

References

Natural gas fields in Turkmenistan
Natural gas fields in Central Asia
Natural gas fields in the Soviet Union